Count Ernesto Montecuccoli (1582 – June 17, 1633) was a general in the service of the Holy Roman Empire during the Thirty Years War, a member of the prominent Italian Montecuccoli Family.

In 1632, troops under Montecuccoli's command burned down the town of Knittlingen. On 16 August of the same year, Montecuccoli's forces were defeated in the Battle of Wiesloch by a Swedish army led by Count Gustav Horn.

He was the uncle of Raimondo Montecuccoli, who started his own military career under Ernesto's command.

1582 births
1633 deaths
Austrian generals
Italian generals
Military personnel of the Thirty Years' War
Italian people of the Thirty Years' War
Austrian people of the Thirty Years' War
Military personnel of the Holy Roman Empire